Basketball at the 2007 Games of the Small States of Europe was held from 5 to 9 June 2007. Games were played at the Salle Gaston Médecin, in Fontvieille, Monaco.

There was no women's competition.

Medal summary

Men's tournament
Men's tournament was played by a round-robin group composed by six teams.

Table

Top scorers

Source:

Notes

References

External links
Monaco 2007 Official Website

Small
2007 Games of the Small States of Europe
2007
Basketball in Monaco